Enrique Peña (born 21 April 1942) is a Colombian racewalker. He competed in the men's 20 kilometres walk at the 1980 Summer Olympics.

References

1942 births
Living people
Athletes (track and field) at the 1980 Summer Olympics
Athletes (track and field) at the 1983 Pan American Games
Colombian male racewalkers
Olympic athletes of Colombia
Place of birth missing (living people)
Pan American Games competitors for Colombia
20th-century Colombian people